The 14229 / 14230 Allahabad Haridwar Express is an Express train belonging to Indian Railways - North Central Railway zone that runs between Allahabad Junction and Haridwar Junction in India.

It operates as train number 14229 from Allahabad Junction to Haridwar Junction and as train number 14230 in the reverse direction serving the states of Uttar Pradesh & Uttarakhand.

Coaches

14115 / 16 Allahabad Haridwar Express presently has 1 AC 2 tier, 1 AC 3 tier, 6 Sleeper Class, 6 Second Class seating & 2 SLR (Seating cum Luggage Rake) coaches. It does not have a Pantry car coach.

As is customary with most train services in India, Coach Composition may be amended at the discretion of Indian Railways depending on demand.

Service

The 14115 Allahabad Haridwar Express covers the distance of 725 kilometres in 14 hours 40 mins (49.43 km/hr) & in 15 hours 20 mins as 14116 Haridwar Allahabad Express (47.28 km/hr).

As the average speed of the train is below 55 km/hr, as per Indian Railways rules, its fare does not include a superfast surcharge.

Routeing

The 14115 / 16 Prayag Ghat Haridwar Express runs from Prayag Ghat Railway Station via Lucknow Junction, Hardoi, Shahjehanpur, Bareilly Junction, Najibabad Junction to Haridwar Junction.

Traction

As the route is fully electrified, a WAP 4 locomotive from the Lucknow shed powers the train for its entire journey.

Timings

14115 Allahabad Haridwar Express leaves Allahabad Junction every Tuesday, Thursday & Sunday at 23:35 hrs IST and reaches Haridwar Junction at 14:15 hrs IST the next day.

14116 Haridwar Allahabad Express leaves Haridwar Junction every Monday, Wednesday & Friday at 16:25 hrs IST and reaches Allahabad Junction at 07:45 hrs IST the next day.

External links

References 

Trains from Allahabad
Trains from Haridwar
Railway services introduced in 2004
Express trains in India